Bibb Manufacturing Company was a textile company founded in Macon, Georgia, in 1876 and was sold to Dan River in 1998. Bibb Manufacturing Company, also known as "The Bibb Company" produced cotton products such as sheets, comforters, towels, curtains, and bedspreads. Bibb Manufacturing not only provided jobs for its employees but also medical care, schools, housing, and social workers to organize clubs, trips, and other events.

Background 
On 25 February 1876, Georgia Governor James Smith approved the incorporation of the Bibb Manufacturing Company. The charter request originated from three men; Major John F. Hanson, Isaac N. Hanson, and Hugh M. Comer. Once it was approved, these same three men became the directors of Bibb Manufacturing Company. Comer was elected president, J. Hanson secretary treasurer, and I. Hanson was in charge of the business office.

Shortly thereafter, J. Hanson went before the Mayor and City Council of Macon, Georgia and demanded that the company be exempted from taxes before they would agree to start the business in Macon. The exemption was granted for 99 years.

Early years 

The first real estate acquired by the company was an old freight house in east Macon. The adjoining 101.59 acres were also purchased.  After some immediate success, Bibb purchased a mill in west Macon that had been owned by Macon Manufacturing. This transaction was completed in 1878. These two mills were then named Bibb Mill Number One and Bibb Mill Number Two. In 1880 the business office was moved from Number One Mill to 111 Third St. The following year the company sold its first stock to Muir and Duckworth, increasing their capital to $150,000.

By 1878, the company had 16,500 spindles and 140 looms. It goods were sold through James Reynolds and Company in New York.

In 1898, Bibb merged with Macon Knitting Company, Taylor Manufacturing (near Reynolds, Ga), the Cordele Manufacturing Company, and Porterdale Mills. Stock at this point was valued at $1.4 million.

In 1900, Bibb bought the Columbus Power Company. The Columbus Power Company included a spindle mill and a dam that generated power for the mill. In 1906, the power company portion was sold, but the mill and 51 acres around the mill were retained.  A new mill, the Columbus Mill, was built and, along with the surrounding land, was incorporated into Bibb City. Also in 1900, the Cordele Manufacturing Company was sold.

In 1927, Bibb bought Payne Cotton Mills. This transaction was initiated in 1904 when J. Hanson recognized an opportunity to acquire the mill after the mill began to suffer from financial difficulties.  The transaction was complicated, full of errors, and took nearly 23 years to complete. In 1919, employees of the mill requested that the land and mill be incorporated as a city. This included the mill, employee houses, gardens, and a community center.  The incorporation was approved in April 1919 and Payne City became a city within Macon, Georgia.

Mill life 
Bibb Manufacturing provided its employees with more than just a job and income. In the communities surrounding some plants, mill villages were built that included housing for employees and company stores. Education was also part of the benefits provided. In 1950, Bibb Manufacturing operated five schools at mill locations outside of Macon. They also operated 19 vocational schools to teach employees how to properly operate equipment. Any church denomination could build a church in mill communities on free land. Bibb Manufacturing would pay one-third of the cost of construction.  In 1950, there were six churches at Bibb mill communities with a membership of 2400.

Bibb Manufacturing also took care of its employees' health. They operated six free clinics with nine doctors and eight nurses. In 1950, 15,000 employees used this free medical service. The nurses also would visit sick people in their homes. At the Porterdale plant, the company maintained a hospital with 20 beds.
Social life was an important part of the Bibb mill communities. As of 1950, the company employed six social workers who were in charge of the social activities in the mill communities. They organized clubs such as women's clubs, Boy Scouts, and Girl Reserves. They also organized camps, fishing trips, and vacation trips to the Atlantic and Florida. The social workers managed the creation of athletic teams such as baseball, softball, swimming, and football. In 1949, over 100,000 people watched the various athletic games. At the Porterdale and Columbus plants, the company maintained two gyms. In other locations, there were four auditoriums for social events, banquets, and entertainment.

Products 
The product line for Bibb Manufacturing included sheets, comforters, bedspreads, towels, curtains for both consumers and hotels, and carpet yarn. They also manufactured industrial textiles to be used in automobile hoses and conveyor belts.

In 1942, Bibb Manufacturing announced the creation of a heat resistant cotton tire cord. One of the purposes for this invention was to conserve rubber that was in limited supply at the time. This cotton cord also was meant to replace rayon that was being used for the war.

 Other licenses included 101 Dalmatians, Casper the Friendly Ghost, Sailor Moon and Batman.

Closure 
 From 1992 – 1995, NTC collected $3 – $4 million a year in management fees.

In 1997, Bibb Manufacturing sold its terry division to West Point Stevens. This included the Rosemary plant which was acquired in 1988 from J.P. Stevens.

In 1998, Dan River, Inc agreed to buy Bibb Manufacturing for approximately $250 million. Two years later, the Macon office of Bibb Manufacturing was closed. The building in East Macon which was once the company headquarters was sold to the city of Macon. The city has since leased the building to the Secretary of the State to be used for Examining Board offices.

Plants and locations

Leadership  
Presidents:

 Hugh Moss Comer 1876–1900
 John Hanson −1900–1908
 W.T. Hanson 1908–1909
 G. Gunby Jordan: 1909–1913
 E. T. Comer: 1913–1919
 William D. Anderson 1919–1936
 William D. Anderson, Jr. 1936–1937
 William D. Anderson – 1937–1941
 Scott Russell 1941–1943
 William D. Anderson 1943–1947
 Charles Hertwig 1947–1956  
 Robert Train 1956–1970
 William S. Manning 1970–1986
 Roland Knight – 1986–1987
 Alan Davis 1987–1992
 Edgar Davis 1992–1994
Thomas Foley 1995–1998

Citations

Bibliography

External links

American companies established in 1876
American companies disestablished in 1998
Manufacturing companies established in 1876
Manufacturing companies disestablished in 1998
Defunct manufacturing companies based in Georgia (U.S. state)
Historic American Engineering Record in Georgia (U.S. state)
1876 establishments in Georgia (U.S. state)
1998 disestablishments in Georgia (U.S. state)